Linguère Department is one of the 45 departments of Senegal, one of the three making up the Louga Region.

There are three urban communes in the department; Dahra, Linguère and Mbeuleukhé

The rural districts (communautés rurales) comprise:
 Barkedji Arrondissement:
 Barkédji
 Gassane
 Thiarny
 Thiel
Dodji Arrondissement:
 Dodji
 Labgar
 Ouarkhokh
Sagatta Djolof Arrondissement:
 Boulal
 Dealy
 Thiamène Pass
 Sagatta Djolof
 Affé Djoloff
Yang-Yang Arrondissement:
 Kamb
 Mboula
 Téssékéré Forage
 Yang-Yang

Population 
As of the December 2002 census, the population was 194,890 inhabitants. In 2005, it was estimated to be 214,883. By 2013 it had grown to 241,898.

Historic sites
 Fortification of Alboury Ndiaye at Yang-Yang
 The Ruins of the Faidherbe Military Post 
 The Royal Residence of Yang-Yang
 The Stele commemorating the mosque of the Tata at Yang-Yang
 The Stele commemorating the Guillé battlefield at Mbeuleukhé

References

External links
Décret n° 2002-166 (ce texte du 21 février 2002 fixe le ressort territorial et le chef-lieu des régions et des départements)
Statistiques Geo Hive

Departments of Senegal
Louga Region